Cheyenne County is a county in the U.S. state of Nebraska. As of the 2010 United States Census, the population was 9,998. Its county seat is Sidney. The county was formed in 1871 and named for the Cheyenne Native American tribe.

In the Nebraska license plate system, Cheyenne County is represented by the prefix 39 as it had the 39th-largest number of vehicles registered in the county when the license plate system was established in 1922.

Geography
Cheyenne County lies on the south side of Nebraska. Its south boundary line abuts with the north boundary line of the state of Colorado.

Major highways

  Interstate 80
  U.S. Highway 30
  U.S. Highway 385
  Nebraska Highway 19

Adjacent counties

 Morrill County - north
 Garden County - northeast
 Deuel County - east
 Sedgwick County, Colorado - southeast
 Logan County, Colorado - south
 Kimball County - west
 Banner County - northwest

Demographics

As of the 2000 United States Census, there were 9,830 people, 4,071 households, and 2,686 families in the county. The population density was 8 people per square mile (3/km2). There were 4,569 housing units at an average density of 4 per square mile (1/km2). The racial makeup of the county was 96.34% White, 0.14% Black or African American, 0.65% Native American, 0.40% Asian, 0.03% Pacific Islander, 1.46% from other races, and 0.98% from two or more races. 4.46% of the population were Hispanic or Latino of any race. 45.3% were of German, 9.1% English, 7.6% Irish and 7.5% American.

There were 4,071 households, out of which 31.10% had children under the age of 18 living with them, 54.80% were married couples living together, 8.00% had a female householder with no husband present, and 34.00% were non-families. 30.10% of all households were made up of individuals, and 13.30% had someone living alone who was 65 years of age or older. The average household size was 2.38 and the average family size was 2.96.

The county population contained 26.30% under the age of 18, 7.00% from 18 to 24, 26.70% from 25 to 44, 22.80% from 45 to 64, and 17.20% who were 65 years of age or older. The median age was 39 years. For every 100 females there were 96.00 males. For every 100 females age 18 and over, there were 92.20 males.

The median income for a household in the county was $33,438, and the median income for a family was $41,024. Males had a median income of $30,000 versus $20,467 for females. The per capita income for the county was $17,437. About 8.20% of families and 10.00% of the population were below the poverty line, including 11.80% of those under age 18 and 7.40% of those age 65 or over.

Communities

City
 Sidney (county seat)

Villages

 Dalton
 Gurley
 Lodgepole
 Potter

Census-designated places
 Lorenzo
 Sunol

Unincorporated communities
 Brownson
 Colton

Politics
Cheyenne County voters are reliably Republican. In no national election since 1936 has the county selected the Democratic Party candidate, and only four total since 1900.

See also
 National Register of Historic Places listings in Cheyenne County, Nebraska

References

 
Nebraska counties
1871 establishments in Nebraska